Cook Islands is a self-governing democracy in the Pacific in free association with New Zealand.

Cook Islands may also refer to.
 Cook Islands Federation, a former British Colony

See also

Cook Island (disambiguation)